Duke Ling of Jin (died 607 BC) was from 620 to 607 BC the ruler of the State of Jin, a major power during the Spring and Autumn period of ancient China. His ancestral name was Ji, given name Yigao, and Duke Ling was his posthumous title.  When his father Duke Xiang of Jin died in 621 BC Yigao was still a young boy.  He ascended the throne with the support of his regent Zhao Dun (趙盾).

In 607 BC, 14 years after ascending the throne, Duke Ling had reached adulthood and become increasingly despotic.  He was known to have had his chef killed for not cooking his bear paws well.  Zhao Dun, who enjoyed a reputation for integrity and incorruptibility, tried to stop him.  Resentful of Zhao Dun's influence, Duke Ling tried to have Zhao assassinated.  Zhao Dun managed to escape, and on 19 August, his half-brother Zhao Chuan (趙穿) rebelled and killed Duke Ling. Zhao Dun and Zhao Chuan then installed Duke Ling's uncle, Duke Wen's youngest son Heitun on the throne, who would be known as Duke Cheng of Jin.

References

Year of birth unknown
Monarchs of Jin (Chinese state)
7th-century BC Chinese monarchs
607 BC deaths